Alubarén is a municipality in the Honduran department of Francisco Morazán. Majority of its population is dedicated to agriculture, livestock, forestry and fishing.

Municipalities of the Francisco Morazán Department